Ganoderma megaloma is a species of bracket fungus in the family Ganodermataceae. Described as new to science in 1846 by mycologist Joseph-Henri Léveillé, it is found in the eastern and midwestern United States. It was moved into the genus Ganoderma by Giacomo Bresàdola in 1912.   The fungus causes white rot and butt rot on living hardwoods.  The holotype was collected in New York.

It is closely related to Ganoderma applanatum.

References

External links
  
http://mushroomobserver.org/204232

Fungi described in 1846
Fungi of the United States
Fungal plant pathogens and diseases
Ganodermataceae
Taxa named by Joseph-Henri Léveillé
Fungi without expected TNC conservation status